Ricardo-AEA Ltd, trading as Ricardo Energy & Environment, was formed on November 8, 2012, when Ricardo acquired the business, operating assets and employees engaged in the business of AEA Technology Plc (AEAT, in administration) (AEA Europe), for a total cash consideration of £18.0 million.

The acquisition saw the AEA Europe business, including an operational staff of approximately 400 located at five UK sites, transferring to Ricardo where it began to operate as Ricardo-AEA under the continued leadership of Robert Bell, reporting to Martin Fausset, managing director of Ricardo UK. Based on its most recent reported results, the assets acquired generated, for the year ended 31 March 2012, annual revenues of £39 million and delivered operating profit margins similar to those of the rest of the Ricardo group.

History
AEA Technology plc was formed in 1996 as the privatised offshoot of the United Kingdom Atomic Energy Authority. It was a constituent of the FTSE Fledgling Index. Originally it consisted of divisions with expertise in a wide variety of areas, mostly the products of nuclear-related research. These included nuclear safety, nuclear engineering, environmental protection, battery technology and non-destructive testing. It mainly acted as a contractor organisation for UKAEA and other governmental and private customers.

AEA Technology was an energy & environmental consultancy business.  The company divested all of the nuclear-related elements of the business and other non-core businesses such as its Rail business where they acquired amongst others NS Technisch Onderzoek .The Dutch branch was later sold and through names as DeltaRail BV and Plurel is now called DEKRA Rail BV. The UK branch is now called  Resonate Group Ltd, previously DeltaRail Group Ltd) through two portfolio sales to secondary private equity investment firms in September 2005 and in September 2006 respectively. The profitable engineering software business was split into two and sold to Aspen Technology (Hyprotech) and Ansys (CFX).

In addition to environmental consultancy the company also worked in the Knowledge Transfer  and Programme Management areas. The business is organised around a mesh style "communities" structure which includes Knowledge Leadership (key technical consultant), Project Management, IT, Marketing and Sales.

The company's main UK operations are located at the Harwell Science and Innovation Campus in Oxfordshire (head office), London, Risley and Glasgow (Scotland).

In 2001 a sub division, EHS Solutions was created with a remit to build an Environment, Health and Safety software business.  It acquired Environmental data Management System Monitor-Pro and Health and Safety software business Lexware. Significant resource was put into product development, however the market at the time was not sufficiently mature, and in 2006 Monitor-Pro was divested, followed by the former Lexware systems.

AEA Technology was fined £250,000 for transporting a 2.5 tonne 60Cobalt Gamma Radiation source  from Cookridge Hospital, Leeds, UK, to Sellafield with defective shielding on 11 March 2002. The company is no longer involved in the transportation of nuclear material.

In August 2006, AEA established a Romania Subsidiary in Bucharest (AEA Mediu) and this was shut down in April 2009.  AEA Technology was voted best Consultancy for Climate Change and Renewables in the EDIE Awards 2007.  AEA Technology  made a number of redundancies throughout 2010; the then CEO, McCree, was quoted as saying "[the company took] 10 per cent off the UK cost base in the year, involving 60 redundancies". AEA has also seen a continuing slump in its share price: from 277p in November 2003 to around 0.4p in January 2012. Shares lost up to one third of their value during 2010 and were even temporarily suspended on the stock exchange.  Andrew McCree quit as Chief Executive Officer in November 2011  and was replaced by John Lowry as Interim CEO.  Lowry had previously been involved in the UK's National Health Service as a restructuring advisor.

AEA Technology went into administration in 2012. Ricardo took on the environmental business and staff. The large pension liability, dating from when the company was much larger and unsupportable by the small remaining company, was transferred to the UK Government's Pension Protection Fund.

Rebrandings & Former Names
Ricardo-AEA was formed by acquisition of AEA Technology. AEA Technology included the division previously known as the Energy Technology Support Unit (ETSU); many reports published under this name are still in circulation. AEA Technology, for a time, included branding as "Future Energy Solutions (incorporating the Energy Technology Support Unit (ETSU))".

Another former division of AEA Technology was Momenta. Momenta provided services to the public sector. Helping turn policy into practice by offering a range of programme management services, including research management, knowledge transfer, best practice, fund management and behaviour change programmes. Its programmes reached businesses, public sector organisations, the third sector, stakeholders and the general public." Major programmes included Envirowise for [Defra] and Knowledge Transfer Partnerships (for the Technology Strategy Board). Momenta and the Digital Solutions Business Unit (DSBU - a small IT sub unit) were merged into the rest of AEA in the UK creating "AEA Consulting" (an internal name) or "AEA Europe".

See also
ESR Technology, a former arm of AEA Technology, working in reliability, safety, and risk

References

External links
Ricardo-AEA website
Monitor-Pro website

Service companies of the United Kingdom
Companies based in Oxfordshire